The 4604th Support Squadron (Texas Towers) is an inactive United States Air Force unit. It was last assigned to the 26th Air Division, Aerospace Defense Command, stationed at Otis Air Force Base, Massachusetts.  It was inactivated on 1 July 1963.

The mission of the squadron was to provide logistical support to the Texas Tower radar stations located offshore in the Atlantic Ocean.

The squadron was activated as the 4604th Aircraft Control and Warning Squadron on 8 October 1956 by the 26th AD at Otis AFB.   It was re-designated as the 4604th Support Squadron (Texas Towers) on 1 December 1956.

The squadron operated helicopters for personnel transport to and from the towers and Otis Air Force Base. It also was capable of transporting up to 76 personnel when necessary to and from the port of New Bedford.

With the end of the Texas Tower project, the squadron was discontinued on 1 July 1963.

See also
 Texas Tower 2
 Texas Tower 3
 Texas Tower 4

References

  A Handbook of Aerospace Defense Organization 1946–1980, by Lloyd H. Cornett and Mildred W. Johnson, Office of History, Aerospace Defense Center, Peterson Air Force Base, Colorado
 Winkler, David F. (1997), Searching the skies: the legacy of the United States Cold War defense radar program. Prepared for United States Air Force Headquarters Air Combat Command.

External links
 Welcome to the Texas Towers Document

Squadrons of the United States Air Force
Logistics units and formations of the United States Air Force
Military units and formations in Massachusetts
1956 establishments in Massachusetts
1963 disestablishments in Massachusetts